Marisa Roseanne Dick (born May 26, 1997) is a Canadian-born female artistic gymnast from Trinidad and Tobago, representing her nation in international competitions. She participated at the 2015 World Championships in Glasgow, and eventually qualified for 2016 Summer Olympics in Rio de Janeiro, finishing fifty-fifth in the preliminary phase of the women's artistic gymnastics with an all-around score of 50.832.

Spending most of her life in Canada, Dick acquired a dual citizenship to compete internationally for her mother's homeland Trinidad and Tobago.

Eponymous skills 
Dick has two eponymous skills listed in the Code of Points.

References

External links 
 

1997 births
Living people
Canadian sportspeople of Trinidad and Tobago descent
Gymnasts at the 2015 Pan American Games
Gymnasts at the 2016 Summer Olympics
Olympic gymnasts of Trinidad and Tobago
Sportspeople from Kamloops
Citizens of Trinidad and Tobago through descent
Trinidad and Tobago female artistic gymnasts
Pan American Games competitors for Trinidad and Tobago
Originators of elements in artistic gymnastics